St Nicholas, Tooting Graveney, is a Church of England parish church in central Tooting, London, England.

History
The church of St Nicholas has its origins in the Saxon period, and is recorded in the Domesday Book of 1086. The original building was extended and altered many times, but retained its round Saxon tower. By 1814 however, the congregation had exceeded its capacity, and it was decided to rebuilt the church on a nearby site, which was achieved in 1832–33 under the architect Thomas Witlam Atkinson, while this new building was itself extended in the Victorian period. It has been a grade II listed building since 1955, and its archives are held by the London Metropolitan Archives.

Present
St Nicholas's continues to be an active local church, with services at 10:30 and 18:00 each Sunday.

St Nicholas's is within the Conservative Evangelical tradition of the Church of England. As a parish that rejects the ordination of women, it receives alternative episcopal oversight from the Bishop of Fulham (currently Jonathan Baker).

Notable clergy
John Buxton Marsden, rector from 1833 to 1844, cleric and historian

References

External links

Tooting Graveney
19th-century Church of England church buildings
Tooting Graveney
Churches completed in 1833
Grade II listed churches in London
Tooting